Mycolicibacter heraklionensis (formerly Mycobacterium heraklionense) is a species of bacteria from the phylum Actinomycetota. It is susceptible to clarithromycin. It is known to cause tenosynovitis in humans, but has also been isolated from sputum, urine, and a soft-tissue ankle mass.

References

Acid-fast bacilli
heraklionensis
Bacteria described in 2013